Industrialny City District is the name of several city divisions in Russia. The name literally means "industrial".
Industrialny City District, Barnaul, a city district of Barnaul, the administrative center of Altai Krai
Industrialny City District, Izhevsk, a city district of Izhevsk, the capital of the Udmurt Republic
Industrialny City District, Khabarovsk, a city district of Khabarovsk, the administrative center of Khabarovsk Krai
Industrialny City District, Perm, a city district of Perm, the administrative center of Perm Krai

See also
Industrialny (disambiguation)
Promyshlenny City District

References